Worms is a city in Rhineland-Palatinate, Germany, situated on the Upper Rhine about  south-southwest of Frankfurt am Main. It had about 82,000 inhabitants .

A pre-Roman foundation, Worms is one of the oldest cities in northern Europe. It was the capital of the Kingdom of the Burgundians in the early fifth century, hence is the scene of the medieval legends referring to this period, notably the first part of the Nibelungenlied.

Worms has been a Roman Catholic bishopric since at least 614, and was an important palatinate of Charlemagne. Worms Cathedral is one of the imperial cathedrals and among the finest examples of Romanesque architecture in Germany. Worms prospered in the High Middle Ages as an imperial free city. Among more than a hundred imperial diets held at Worms, the Diet of 1521 (commonly known as the Diet of Worms) ended with the Edict of Worms, in which Martin Luther was declared a heretic. Worms is also one of the historical ShUM-cities as a cultural center of Jewish life in Europe during the Middle Ages. Its Jewish sites (along with those in Speyer and Mainz) were inscribed on the UNESCO World Heritage List in 2021.

Today, the city is an industrial centre and is famed as the origin of Liebfraumilch wine. Its other industries include chemicals, metal goods, and fodder.

Geography

Geographic location
Worms is located on the west bank of the River Rhine between the cities of Ludwigshafen and Mainz. On the northern edge of the city, the Pfrimm flows into the Rhine, and on the southern edge, the Eisbach flows into the Rhine.

Boroughs
Worms has 13 boroughs (or "quarters") around the city centre. They are:

Climate
The climate in the Rhine Valley is temperate in winter and enjoyable in summer. Rainfall is below average for the surrounding areas. Winter snow accumulation is low and often melts quickly.

History

Antiquity
Worms was in ancient times a Celtic city named Borbetomagus, perhaps meaning "water meadow". Later it was conquered by the Germanic Vangiones. In 14 BC, Romans under the command of Drusus captured and fortified the city, and from that time onwards, a small troop of infantry and cavalry was garrisoned there. The Romans renamed the city as Augusta Vangionum, after the then-emperor and the local tribe. The name does not seem to have taken hold, however, and from Borbetomagus developed the German Worms and Latin Wormatia; as late as the modern period, the city name was written as Wormbs. The garrison grew into a small town with a regular Roman street plan, a forum, and temples for the main gods Jupiter, Juno, Minerva (whose temple was the site of the later cathedral), and Mars.

Roman inscriptions, altars, and votive offerings can be seen in the archaeological museum, along with one of Europe's largest collections of Roman glass. Local potters worked in the town's south quarter. Fragments of amphorae contain traces of olive oil from Hispania Baetica, doubtless transported by sea and then up the Rhine by ship.

During the disorders of 411–413 AD,  Roman usurper Jovinus established himself in Borbetomagus as a puppet-emperor with the help of King Gunther of the Burgundians, who had settled in the area between the Rhine and Moselle some years before. The city became the capital of the Burgundian kingdom under Gunther (also known as Gundicar). Few remains of this early Burgundian kingdom survive, because in 436, it was all but destroyed by a combined army of Romans (led by Aëtius) and Huns (led by Attila); a belt clasp found at Worms-Abenheim is a museum treasure. Provoked by Burgundian raids against Roman settlements, the combined Romano-Hunnic army destroyed the Burgundian army at the Battle of Worms (436), killing King Gunther. About 20,000 are said to have been killed. The Romans led the survivors southwards to the Roman district of Sapaudia (modern-day Savoy). The story of this war later inspired the Nibelungenlied. The city appears on the Peutinger Map, dated to the fourth century.

Middle Ages

The bishopric of Worms existed by at least 614. In the Frankish Empire, the city was the location of an important palace of Charlemagne. The bishops administered the city and its territory. The most famous of the early medieval bishops was Burchard of Worms. In 868, an important synod was held in Worms. Around 900, the circuit wall was rebuilt according to the wall-building ordinance of Bishop Thietlach.

Worms prospered in the High Middle Ages. Having received far-reaching privileges from King Henry IV as early as 1074, the city became an imperial free city. The bishops resided at Ladenburg and only had jurisdiction over Worms Cathedral itself. In 1122, the Concordat of Worms was signed; the 1495 imperial diet met here and made an attempt at reforming the disintegrating Imperial Circle Estates by the Imperial Reform. Most important, among more than 100 imperial diets held at Worms, that of 1521 (commonly known as the Diet of Worms) ended with the Edict of Worms, in which Martin Luther was declared a heretic after refusing to recant his religious beliefs. Worms was also the birthplace of the first Bibles of the Reformation, both Martin Luther's German Bible and William Tyndale's first complete English New Testament by 1526.

The Free Imperial City of Worms, known in medieval Hebrew by the name Varmayza or Vermaysa (ורמיזא, ורמישא), was a centre of medieval Ashkenazic Judaism. The Jewish community was established there in the late 10th century, and Worms's first synagogue was erected in 1034. In 1096, 800 Jews were murdered by crusaders and the local mob. The Jewish Cemetery in Worms, dating from the 11th century, is believed to be the oldest surviving in situ cemetery in Europe. The Rashi Synagogue, which dates from 1175 and was carefully reconstructed after its desecration on Kristallnacht, is the oldest in Germany. Prominent students, rabbis, and scholars of Worms include Shlomo Yitzhaki (Rashi) who studied with R. Yizhak Halevi, Meir of Rothenburg (Maharam), Elazar Rokeach, Maharil, and Yair Bacharach. At the rabbinical synod held at Worms at the turn of the 11th century, Rabbi Gershom ben Judah (Rabbeinu Gershom) explicitly prohibited polygamy for the first time. For hundreds of years, until Kristallnacht in 1938, the Jewish Quarter of Worms was a centre of Jewish life. Worms today has only a very small Jewish population, and a recognizable Jewish community as such no longer exists. After renovations in the 1970s and 1980s, though, many of the buildings of the quarter can be seen in a close-to-original state, preserved as an outdoor museum.

Modern era
In 1689 during the Nine Years' War, Worms (like the nearby towns and cities of Heidelberg, Mannheim, Oppenheim, Speyer, and Bingen) was sacked by troops of King Louis XIV of France, though the French only held the city for a few weeks. In 1743, the Treaty of Worms was signed, forming a political alliance between Great Britain, Austria, and the Kingdom of Sardinia. In 1792, the city was occupied by troops of the French First Republic during the French Revolutionary Wars. The Bishopric of Worms was secularized in 1801, with the city being annexed into the First French Empire. In 1815, Worms passed to the Grand Duchy of Hesse in accordance with the Congress of Vienna, and the city was subsequently administered within Rhenish Hesse.

After the Battle of the Bulge in early 1945, Allied armies advanced into the Rhineland in preparation for a massive assault into the heart of the Reich. Worms was a German strongpoint on the west bank of the Rhine, and the forces there resisted the Allied advance tenaciously. Worms was, thus, heavily bombed by the Royal Air Force and the U.S. Army Air Forces in two attacks on February 21 and March 18, 1945, respectively. A postwar survey estimated that 39% of the town's developed area was destroyed. The RAF attack on Feb. 21 was aimed at the main railway station on the edge of the inner city, and at chemical plants southwest of the inner city, but also destroyed large areas of the city centre. Carried out by 334 bombers, the attack in a few minutes rained 1,100 tons of bombs on the inner city, and Worms Cathedral was among the buildings set on fire. The Americans did not enter the city until the Rhine crossings began after the seizure of the Remagen Bridge.

In the attacks, 239 inhabitants were killed in the first and 141 in the second; 35,000 (60% of the population of 58,000) were made homeless. In all, 6,490 buildings were severely damaged or destroyed. After the war, the inner city was rebuilt, mostly in modern style. Postwar Worms became part of the new state of Rhineland-Palatinate; the borough Rosengarten, on the east bank of the Rhine, was lost to Hesse.

Worms today fiercely vies with the cities Trier and Cologne for the title of "Oldest City in Germany". A multimedia Nibelungenmuseum was opened in 2001, and a yearly festival in front of the Dom, the Worms Cathedral, attempts to recapture the atmosphere of the pre-Christian period.

In 2010, the Worms synagogue was firebombed. Eight corners of the building were set ablaze, and a Molotov cocktail was thrown at a window, but with no injuries. Kurt Beck, Minister-President of Rhineland-Palatinate, condemned the attack and vowed to mobilize all necessary resources to find the perpetrators, saying, "We will not tolerate such an attack on a synagogue".

Main sights

The renovated (1886–1935) Romanesque Cathedral, dedicated to St Peter (12th-13th century)
Reformation Memorial church of the Holy Trinity, the city's largest Protestant church (17th century)
 St Paul's Church (Pauluskirche) (13th century)
 St Andrew's Collegiate Church (Andreaskirche) (13th century)
St Martin's Church (Martinskirche) (13th century)
Liebfrauenkirche (15th century)
Luther Monument (Lutherdenkmal) (1868) (designed by Ernst Rietschel)
ShUM city of Worms, UNESCO World Heritage Site
Rashi Synagogue and Mikvah
Jewish Museum in the Rashi-House
Jewish Cemetery
Nibelungen Museum, celebrating the Middle High German epic poem Das Nibelungenlied (The Song of the Nibelungs)
 Magnuskirche, the city's smallest church, which possibly originates from the eighth century

Twin towns – sister cities

Worms is twinned with:

 Auxerre, France
 Bautzen, Germany
 Mobile, Alabama, United States
 Ningde, China
 Parma, Italy
 St Albans, England, United Kingdom
 Tiberias, Israel

Notable people

Samuel Adler (1809–1891), German-American Reform rabbi
Curtis Bernhardt (1899–1981), film director
John Derst (1838–1928), baker
Marvin Dienst (born 1997), German racing driver
Hans Diller (1905–1977), classical scholar specializing in Ancient Greek medicine
Ferdinand Eberstadt (1808–1888), textile merchant and mayor of Worms
Ludwig Edinger (1855–1918), anatomist and neurologist
Saint Erentrude, or Erentraud ( 650–710), virgin saint of the Roman Catholic Church
Hans Folz (1435/1440–1513), notable medieval author
Friedrich Gernsheim (1839–1916), composer, conductor and pianist
Florian Gerster (born 1949), politician (SPD), former chairman of the Federal Employment Agency
Petra Gerster (born 1955), television journalist (ZDF)
Johann Nikolaus Götz (1721–1781), poet
Siegfried Guggenheim (1873–1961), lawyer, notary and art collector
Isaac ben Eliezer Halevi (died 1070), French rabbi
Heribert of Cologne ( 970–1021, archbishop-elector of Cologne and Chancellor of the Holy Roman Empıre
Timo Hildebrand (born 1979), footballer
Richard Hildebrandt (1897–1951), politician in Nazi Germany and member of the Reichstag executed for war crimes
Hans Hinkel (1901–1960), journalist and Nazi cultural functionary
Hanya Holm (1893–1992), choreographer, dancer, educator and one of the founders of American Modern Dance
Vladimir Kagan (1927–2016), furniture designer
Solomon Loeb (1828–1903), American banker and philanthropist
Meir of Rothenburg (1215–1293), rabbi and poet
Conrad Meit (or Conrat Meit) (1480s–1550/1551), Renaissance sculptor, mostly in the Low Countries
Minna of Worms (died 1096), influential Jewish citizen, victim of the Worms massacre (1096)
Rashi (Shlomo Yitzhaki; 1040–1105), rabbi, studied in the Worms Yeshiva in 1065–1070
Juspa Schammes (1604–1678), caretaker of the Worms Synagogue and writer
Alica Schmidt (born 1998), track and field athlete, fitness coach
Hugo Sinzheimer (1875–1945), legal scholar, member of the Constitutional Convention of 1919
Hermann Staudinger (1881–1965), organic chemist, Nobel Prize in Chemistry 1953
Rudi Stephan (1887–1915), composer
Monika Stolz (born 1951), politician (CDU), Member of Landtag Baden-Württemberg since 2001
Ida Straus (1849–1912), wife of Isidor Straus, voluntarily remained with husband on board the RMS Titanic
Emil Stumpp (1886–1941), cartoonist, died in jail after doing an unflattering portrait of Adolf Hitler
Rod Temperton (1949–2016), English songwriter, record producer and musician
Markus Weinmann (born 1974), agricultural scientist in the area of plant physiology

See also
Wormser

References

Further reading
 Roemer, Nils H. German City, Jewish Memory: The Story of Worms (Brandeis University Press, 2010)  online review

External links

The Official website of the city of Worms 
Explore the ShUM Sites of Speyer, Worms and Mainz in the UNESCO collection on Google Arts and Culture
Nibelungenmuseum website 
wormser-dom.de, website of the Worms Cathedral with pictures  (click on the "Bilder" link in the left panel)
Wormatia, Worms football club 

 
1789 disestablishments
Historic Jewish communities
States and territories established in the 11th century
Former states and territories of Rhineland-Palatinate
Rhenish Hesse
Holocaust locations in Germany